Intraosseous eruption involves the formation of root of a tooth which allows the tooth to erupt from the bone. This phase precedes the supraosseous eruption phase which consists of infragingival eruption and supragingival eruption. Both the intraosseous eruption and supraosseous eruption are part of an eruption phase called prefunctional eruption.

References

"Lecture Notes in Dentistry." Tooth Eruption And Factors Influencing Tooth Eruption...ppt Download And 3D Animations. Navydent. Web. 6 May 2012. <http://dentallecnotes.blogspot.com/2011/08/tooth-eruption-and-factors-influencing.html>.

Dentistry